The Cape of Good Hope Government Gazette was the government gazette of Cape Colony.

It was published in Cape Town between 7 June 1826 and May 1910, and was continued by the Province of Cape of Good Hope Official Gazette when Cape Colony became the Province of the Cape of Good Hope.

See also
List of British colonial gazettes

References

British colonial gazettes
Publications established in 1826
Cape Colony
1910 disestablishments in South Africa
1826 establishments in the British Empire